Statistics of Danish 1st Division in the 1917/1918 season.

Province tournament

First round
Frederiksborg IF 3-1 Boldklubben 1901
Odense Boldklub 1-3 Randers Sportsklub Freja

Final
Frederiksborg IF 0-1 Randers Sportsklub Freja

Copenhagen Championship

Final
Kjøbenhavns Boldklub 5-2 Randers Sportsklub Freja

References
Denmark - List of final tables (RSSSF)

1917–18 in Danish football
Top level Danish football league seasons
Denmark